Sir John Boyd of Maxpoffle JP (1826–1893) was a 19th-century Scottish businessman who served as Lord Provost of Edinburgh from 1888 to 1891.

Life

He was born in Edinburgh in 1826 and appears to have had multiple careers from house agent to upholsterer and even an undertaker. He had premises at 2 York Place.

He joined Edinburgh Town Council in 1881 and became Lord Provost in 1888.  Whilst Lord Provost he lived at 11, Abercromby Place in Edinburgh's Second New Town. His Town Clerk during office was William Skinner of Corra.

His knighthood and title were conferred by Queen Victoria c.1891. The title "of Maxpoffle" derives from his country property of Maxpoffle House, between Bowden and Newtown St. Boswells in the Scottish Borders. The house was an impressive Scots Baronial mansion.

Family
He was married to Isabella Lawson, daughter of John Lawson WS from Biggar in Peeblesshire.

Their children included Rev. Arthur Hamilton Boyd MC TD (b.1869) a distinguished army chaplain. His eldest son John Boyd (b. 1856)became an advocate operating from 2 Abercromby Place. He later became Sheriff John Boyd. A further son, William Boyd (1862-1921) was also a lawyer.

His grandchildren included 2nd/Lt. Nigel John Lawson Boyd and Lt. William Noel Lawson Boyd, both killed in the First World War and memorialised in Bowden Kirk in the Scottish Borders with a plaque by Sir Robert Lorimer. and Fr. Basil Jellicoe, an Anglo-Catholic "slum priest" and housing reformer.

Boyd died at his country home in Maxpoffle, Roxburghshire on 9 October 1893.

References

1826 births
1893 deaths
Businesspeople from Edinburgh
Lord Provosts of Edinburgh